Arkansas Highway 202 (AR 202 and Hwy. 202) is a designation for two east–west state highway in Arkansas. One segment runs  from US 62/US 412 in Yellville east to Highway 178. A second portion runs  from Bull Shoals Lake east to Arkansas Highway 5 in Baxter County. Both routes are maintained by the Arkansas State Highway and Transportation Department (AHTD).

Route description

Yellville to Flippin
The route begins at US 62/US 412 in Yellville and runs east to AR 14 in Summit. The route continues east to AR 178 in Flippin, where it terminates. Highway 202 is entirely two–lane, undivided.

Bull Shoals Lake to Highway 5
Highway 202 begins at County Route 141 at the Oakland Use Area near Bull Shoals Lake and runs east. After serving the unincorporated community of Oakland, the highway enters Baxter County to terminate at Highway 5. The route is a low traffic route, with under 700 vehicles per day along its length as of 2010.

History
The Arkansas State Highway Commission designated Highway 202 between Bull Shoals and Highway 5 on July 10, 1957. A second segment was created in Marion County in May 1973, but was removed in a trade for the Yellville to Flippin segment in August 1975.

Major intersections

Former route

Route description
The route began at Highway 14 in Lakeway and ran east. State maintenance ended, with the route continuing east as a county road.

History
A second segment of Highway 202 was created near Lakeway on May 23, 1973 pursuant to Act 9 of 1973 by the Arkansas General Assembly. The Marion County Judge requested this segment and a former segment of Highway 235 to be deleted in exchange for adding the route between Yellville and Flippin. This designation change was approved on August 26, 1975.

Major intersections

See also

 List of state highways in Arkansas

References

External links

202
Transportation in Baxter County, Arkansas
Transportation in Marion County, Arkansas